This is an impartial (not implicitly biased to a single governing body, the BRFC) and comprehensive record list of 294 British record freshwater fish,  past and present, involving 59 different species/sub-species of fish caught using the traditional angling method of rod and line. Records to include the angler, species, weight, date, venue, also referenced with a recognizable publication. The list is intended to include all categories of fish caught by anglers, that enter freshwater including (coarse and game fish) and some migratory sea fish.



Current records supported by photographic evidence

Current records not supported by any photographic evidence

Record Endangered Species

Record Ornamental sub-species

Record non-indigenous (invasive) species

Historical Previous records

Ambiguous record claims (no venue given /not accepted / expunged)

There have been many ambiguous record claims over the years. Here are a few of those that never made the record list, with the reason why in bold:
21 lb 2oz Barbel caught by Chris Mack on the Wensum 2008. No independent witnesses to the weigh in.
 5 oz 8 dr Bleak caught by David Selley on the River Lark 2017. Rejected as a hybrid by BRFC. 
 38 lb Ferox Brown Trout  caught by old Willie Maule. Evidence destroyed by fire.
 8 lb Burbot largest ever recorded in England, caught from the river Trent around 1700–1800. No date/also method of capture unknown.
83lb 4oz Mirror Carp "Big Plated" caught from Wingham syndicate carp lake in Kent, November 2017.  No record claimed - angler wanted no publicity.
10 lb 8oz Chub caught from the River Annan in 1955 by Dr. J. A. Cameron. Not authenticated with photo or body scales for examination.
5lb 2oz Crucian caught by Mick Phillips at an undisclosed club lake in Hampshire, August 2021. Assume no DNA presented. 
1lb 6oz Dace caught from a Nene tributary Feb 2016. Angler's name unknown and no record claimed.
13 lb 1oz Eel caught by Dave saunders at Idenwood Fishery, East Sussex in 2010. No independent witnesses.
9lb Golden Orfe (estimated) caught by Bob Roberts at Anglers Paradise, Devon in Feb 2009. Not weighed.Golden orfe video
5 lb Grayling caught by Dave Williams from the River Severn near Newtown, Wales, in 2010. Captor ate the evidence with chips + No independent witnesses.
6oz Gudgeon caught by Ashley Bennett from the River Wandle in 2016. Not weighed. 
1lb 3oz 4dr Lamprey (river) caught by S.Clews from River Severn in May 1924. No confirmation this fish was caught by rod and line method. 
6 lb 4oz Perch caught by angler known as  "Bill" from River Thames in March 2014. Assumed reason is lack of  independent witnesses. 
70lb Pike (Largest ever) found dead at River Endrick/Loch Lomond in 1934 Not caught by rod and line. 
5 lb 2oz Rudd caught by Adrian Cannon from a Fenland Drain 2012. No independent witnesses.

Video footage of chub and carp records
 [https://twitter.com/WasingSporting/status/687348504084267008 Dean Fletcher's 68lb 1oz British record carp "The Parrot" about to be weighed, January 2016 courtesy of twitter].
 Neill Stephen's 9lb 5oz British record-equaling chub of 2012 at the weigh in, courtesy of YouTube.
 Oz Holness's 67lb 8oz British record carp "Two Tone" being weighed in, 2008 courtesy of YouTube.

Non-indigenous (invasive) alien species
These fish are classed as a significant risk to our native species and if caught must be removed immediately to protect the wider environment and should be reported to the Environment Agency (EA). Anyone found introducing non indigenous (invasive) species to any external body of UK water will be breaching the Import of Live Fish (England and Wales) Act 1980 and will be prosecuted.  The fish in question include: Black bullhead Catfish (Ameiurus melas), Doctor fish (Garra rufa), Fathead minnow (Pimephales promelas), Largemouth bass (Micropterus salmoides), Smallmouth bass (Micropterus dolomieu), Siberian sturgeon (Acipenser baerii), Sterlet (Acipenser ruthenus), Topmouth gudgeon (Pseudorasbora parva), Sunbleak (Leucaspius delineatus), Walleye (Sander vitreus).

 Note that this does not apply to non-indigenous fish which are included on the main record list which are Carp, Crucian carp, Goldfish, Grass Carp, Ide, Orfe, Pumpkinseed, Rainbow trout, Wels Catfish, and Zander, which are now considered to be naturalized.

Notes
 Note 1 see Angling records of Europe.
 Note 2 * - This is possibly one of the many records rejected by the BRFC when it was decided to nullify most of the existing British record fish in the purge of 1968, due to lack of creditable evidence.
 Note 3 This fish is listed as either extinct in the UK only , Critically Endangered species (IUCN) status, Endangered species (IUCN) status, Vulnerable species (IUCN) status,  by the International Union for Conservation of Nature (IUCN). 
 Note 4 - It is assumed that Wels catfish records were suspended by the BRFC in 2000 due to suspected importation of a fish near to or over the British Record, which could also quite possibly be an infringement of Import of Live Fish (England and Wales) Act 1980.
 Note 5 - No records have been found for Pollan (Coregonus pollan) which are found only in Northern Ireland, listed as an Endangered species (IUCN) status'.
 Note 6 - No records have been found for Spined loach (Cobitis taenia).
 Note 7 - See non indigenous (invasive) species above
 Note 8 - This record is or was not recognised by the BRFC.
 Note 9 - Natural river species (chub, barbel, grayling) will not be recognized when caught in Stillwater, as considered cultivated in a non-natural environment.  
 Note 10 - No photographic evidence has been published.
 Note 11'' - Possible misidentification of species by BRFC, as similar fish caught 21 years later identified as Channel catfish (Ictalurus punctatus)

References

Angling records
Freshwater fish of Europe
Fish of Europe
Recreational fishing in the United Kingdom